Mark Morris Davis (born 27 November 1952) ForMemRS is director and Avery Family Professor of Immunology in the Institute for Immunity, Transplantation and Infection at Stanford University.

Education
Davis was educated at Johns Hopkins University and the California Institute of Technology (Caltech) where he was awarded a PhD in 1981 for research supervised by Leroy E. Hood.

Research
Davis is well known for identifying the first T-cell receptor genes, which are responsible for T lymphocytes ability to "see" foreign entities, solving a major mystery in immunology at that time. He and his research group have made many subsequent discoveries about this type of molecule, subsequently, specifically concerning its biochemical properties and other characteristics, including the demonstration that T cells are able to detect and respond to even a single molecule of their ligand-fragments of antigens bound to Major Histocompatibility Complex cell surface molecules. He also developed a novel way of labeling specific T lymphocytes according to the molecules that they recognize, and this procedure is now an important method in many clinical and basic studies of T cell activity, from new vaccines against cancer to identifying "rogue" T cells in autoimmunity. In recent years his has increasingly focused on understanding the human immune system, from developing broad systems biology approaches to inventing new methods to help unravel the complexities of T cell responses to cancer, autoimmunity and infectious diseases.

Awards and honors
Davis has won numerous awards including:

 Passano Young Scientist Award together with James Edward Rothman in 1985
 Eli Lilly and Company Research Award in 1986
 Howard Taylor Ricketts Award in 1987
 Gairdner Foundation International Award in 1989
 Elected a member of the National Academy of Sciences in 1993
 King Faisal International Prize in 1995
 Alfred P. Sloan, Jr. Prize together with Tak W. Mak in 1996
 Membership in the American Academy of Arts and Sciences in 2000 
 William B. Coley Award in 2000
 Paul Ehrlich and Ludwig Darmstaedter Prize together with Tak Wah Mak in 2004 
 Elected a Foreign Member of the Royal Society (ForMemRS) in 2016

Szent-Györgyi Prize for Progress in Cancer Research with Tak Wah Mak in 2021

External links 
 Mark Davis Lab Homepage at Stanford University

References

1952 births
Living people
American immunologists
Stanford University faculty
Johns Hopkins University alumni
California Institute of Technology alumni
Foreign Members of the Royal Society
Members of the National Academy of Medicine
Fellows of the American Academy of Arts and Sciences
Members of the United States National Academy of Sciences